Bartosz Soćko (born 10 November 1978) is a Polish chess player who holds the FIDE title of Grandmaster (GM). In 2008, he became the Polish national champion.

Chess career 
He played for Poland at six Chess Olympiads (2000, 2002, 2004, 2006, 2008 and 2010) and at six European Team Chess Championships (1999, 2001, 2003, 2005, 2007 and 2009). He took part in the Chess World Cup 2011, but was eliminated in the first round by Victor Bologan.

In 2013 he won the Riga Technical University Open.

In 2021 he won against the world champion Magnus Carlsen in the FIDE world blitz championships. 

His wife is GM Monika Soćko.

References

External links 

 
 
 
 

1978 births
Living people
Polish chess players
Chess grandmasters
Chess Olympiad competitors
People from Piaseczno
Sportspeople from Masovian Voivodeship